Igor Pikayzen (Russian: Игорь Леонидович Пикайзен; born November 16, 1987) is a Russian-American violinist.

Early life
Pikayzen was born in Moscow, Russia to a highly musical family. He began his violin lessons at the age of 5 with his grandfather Wiktor Alexandrowitsch Pikaisen. At the age of 8 he gave his first concert Mozart's Concerto No. 2 and by the age of 12 he began appearing with Moscow Radio Symphony, Ankara Philharmonic and Moscow Chamber Orchestra. In 1999 he relocated to the United States and began studying at the Manhattan School of Music with Keng-Yuen Tseng as his guide.

He holds a BM from The Juilliard School and an MM and AD from Yale School of Music, as well as being a DMA candidate at the City University of New York Graduate Center

Career
Since 2012 he has appeared as a soloist with major orchestras across Europe, Asia, North and South America in Carnegie Hall, Tchaikovsky Hall, Flagey, Alice Tully Hall, Cadogan Hall, Taipei Concert Hall, President Hall, Tbilisi Opera Hall, Newman Arts Center, Sala Felipe Villanueva, National Palace of Arts in Mexico City, Teatro San Cugat in Barcelona, Teatro de Llago en Frutillar, Teatro Carlo Felice, Sendai Concert Hall in Japan, Minor Hall of Moscow Conservatory. Appearing as a soloist with the national symphonic orchestras of Russia, Japan, Canada, Taiwan, Turkey, Mexico, Poland, Italy, Romania, Mexico, Chile, Georgia, and the US, he has performed under the batons of such conductors as Jorge Mester, Łukasz Borowicz, Brett Mitchell, Lior Shambadal, Toshiyuki Shimada, Emil Tabakov, Hobart Earle, Gürer Aykal, Thomas Rösner, Jerzy Salwarowski, Nurhan Arman, Daniel Huppert, Jose-Luis Dominguez and countless others.

Igor Pikayzen has recorded works of Paganini, Ysaye, Tchaikovsky, Marteau, Debussy, Brahms, Elliott Carter, Saint-Saens for Naxos Pentatone ProMusica, Ansonia labels. He  is a frequent guest at festivals in Georgia, Peru, Germany, Switzerland and USA. He is currently Professor of Violin at the Lamont School of Music at the University of Denver.

Awards
2008 — International Competition for Violin Kloster Schöntal, Schöntal Germany — 2nd Prize
2009 — Tadeusz Wronski International Competition, Warsaw Poland — 1st Prize
2013 — Henryk Szeryng International Violin Competition — 2nd Prize
2015 - Luis Sigall International Violin Competition "Vina del Mar" - 1st prize

References

 www.igorpikayzen.com

Living people
20th-century births
Russian violinists
American male violinists
Juilliard School alumni
Yale University alumni
City University of New York alumni
Russian emigrants to the United States
21st-century American violinists
21st-century American male musicians
Year of birth missing (living people)